Theodore John Cottrell Jr. (born May 3, 1982) is a former American football tight end. He was signed by the Minnesota Vikings of the National Football League (NFL) as an undrafted free agent in 2004. He played college football at Buffalo State College. Cottrell was also a member of the Rhein Fire, Frankfurt Galaxy, San Diego Chargers, Rochester Raiders and New York Sentinels. He is the son of former NFL linebacker Ted Cottrell; in all of his NFL and UFL appearances, T. J. was on a team where his father was coaching at the time.

References

External links
 Just Sports Stats

1982 births
Living people
American football defensive ends
American football tight ends
Buffalo State Bengals football players
Frankfurt Galaxy players
Minnesota Vikings players
New York Sentinels players
Rhein Fire players
Rochester Raiders players
San Diego Chargers players
Players of American football from Buffalo, New York